The 2018–19 Ranji Trophy was the 85th season of the Ranji Trophy, the premier first-class cricket tournament that took place in India between November 2018 and February 2019. Vidarbha were the defending champions. The final took place between Vidarbha and Saurashtra, starting on 3 February 2019. Vidarbha defeated Saurashtra by 78 runs in the final, to become the sixth team in the tournament's history to retain their title.

Background
In April 2018, the Board of Control for Cricket in India (BCCI) reinstated Bihar for the competition, bringing the total teams to 29. In July 2018, the BCCI increased the total number of teams to 37, with the addition of Arunachal Pradesh, Manipur, Meghalaya, Mizoram, Nagaland, Pondicherry, Sikkim and Uttarakhand.

Format
The tournament had four groups, with nine teams each in Groups A and B, and ten teams in Group C. All the new teams were placed in the Plate Group. The teams in the Plate Group were allowed to have up to three professional players in their squads. The top two teams from Group C and the top team in the Plate Group progressed to the quarter-finals of the tournament, along with five teams from Groups A and B.

Summary

League phase
The opening round of fixtures saw a total of 94 players making their first-class cricket debut.

In the third round match between Vidarbha and Baroda, Vidarbha's Wasim Jaffer became the first batsman to score 11,000 runs in the Ranji Trophy. In the fourth round match between Pondicherry and Mizoram, Pondicherry's Pankaj Singh set a new record for the most five-wicket hauls against different teams in the Ranji Trophy with 17. The fourth round of fixtures also saw the first occasion that seven captains scored centuries.

In round five, Paras Dogra batting for Pondicherry scored 253 runs against Sikkim. It was his eighth double century, going past Ajay Sharma's record of seven double centuries in the Ranji Trophy. Also in round five, Ajay Rohera set a new record for the highest score on debut in a first-class match. Batting for Madhya Pradesh against Hyderabad, he scored 267 not out, breaking the record of 260 runs set by Amol Mazumdar in 1994. Naman Ojha became the most successful wicket-keeper in Ranji Trophy history, breaking Vinayak Samant's record of 355 dismissals as wicket-keeper.     

In the sixth round of fixtures, Milind Kumar of Sikkim became the first batsman to score 1,000 runs in this edition of the tournament. He did so in the match against Mizoram, in his ninth innings of the competition. In round seven of the tournament, Ashutosh Aman of Bihar became the first bowler to take 50 wickets in this years' Ranji Trophy tournament. He went on to finish the tournament with 68 wickets, breaking the previous record of 64 dismissals set by Bishan Singh Bedi in the 1974–75 tournament. Round eight saw Pankaj Singh of Pondicherry become the first seam bowler to take 400 wickets in the Ranji Trophy. In round nine, Tripura and Madhya Pradesh were both dismissed for just 35 runs in one of their innings.

The group stage of the tournament saw two captains retire from all forms of cricket. In November 2018, Gautam Gambhir initially stepped down as captain of Delhi, before announcing his retirement the following month. Gambhir went on to score 112 in his final innings, his 43rd century in first-class cricket. Saurashtra's captain, Jaydev Shah, also retired from cricket in December. He made record for most matches as captain in Ranji Trophy.

The ninth round match between Vidarbha and Saurashtra was Wasim Jaffer's 146th match in the Ranji Trophy. He broke Devendra Bundela's record of playing in the most Ranji matches.

On 2 January 2019, Rajasthan from Group C became the first team to qualify for the quarter-finals, after they beat Goa by ten wickets. Ahead of the penultimate round of fixtures, ten teams across Groups A and B still had a chance to progress to the quarter-finals. Vidarbha became the first team to qualify from Group A, after Baroda beat Karnataka by two wickets in their final group-stage match. Despite the loss, Karnataka also qualified from Group A. Uttarakhand won the Plate Group and advanced to the quarter-finals. On the final day of the group stage, Saurashtra and Gujarat from Group A, Kerala from Group B and Uttar Pradesh from Group C had also qualified for the quarter-finals.

Chhattisgarh and Maharashtra across Groups A and B were relegated to Group C, while Goa were relegated from Group C to the Plate Group for the next season.

Knockout phase
Kerala were the first team to progress from the quarter-finals, after they beat Gujarat by 113 runs. It was the first time in the team's history that they had reached the semi-finals of the Ranji Trophy, beating their previous best of the quarter-finals, in the previous edition. The second team to qualify for the semi-finals was Karnataka, after they beat Rajasthan by six wickets. Defending champions Vidarbha beat Uttarakhand from the Plate Group by an innings and 115 runs to reach the semi-finals. In the last quarter-final fixture to finish, Saurashtra completed the highest successful run chase to win a match in the Ranji Trophy, scoring 372 runs to beat Uttar Pradesh by six wickets.

The first semi-final saw the defending champions Vidarbha beat Kerala by an innings and 11 runs inside two days. Wasim Jaffer became the first batsman to score 1,000 runs in two different seasons of the Ranji Trophy. Umesh Yadav took his best match figures in first-class cricket, taking twelve wickets for 79 runs. In the second semi-final, Saurashtra defeated Karnataka by five wickets.

Vidarbha defeated Saurashtra by 78 runs in the final, to become the sixth team in the tournament's history to retain their title. Vidarbha's captain Faiz Fazal said that "it is not easy to win the Ranji Trophy. To win eleven matches, it's not a fluke. If anyone thought last year was a fluke, we have proven ourselves again". For Saurashtra, it was their third straight loss in Ranji Trophy finals, with their captain Jaydev Unadkat saying he was really proud of how his team performed during the tournament.

Player transfers
The following player transfers were approved ahead of the season. All the new teams in the Plate Group also transferred players into their squads, along with signing professionals.

Teams
The teams were drawn in the following groups:

Group A
 Baroda
 Chhattisgarh
 Gujarat
 Karnataka
 Maharashtra
 Mumbai
 Railways
 Saurashtra
 Vidarbha

Group B
 Andhra
 Bengal
 Delhi
 Himachal Pradesh
 Hyderabad
 Kerala
 Madhya Pradesh
 Punjab
 Tamil Nadu

Group C
 Assam
 Goa
 Haryana
 Jammu & Kashmir
 Jharkhand
 Odisha
 Rajasthan
 Services
 Tripura
 Uttar Pradesh

Plate Group
 Arunachal Pradesh
 Bihar
 Manipur
 Meghalaya
 Mizoram
 Nagaland
 Pondicherry
 Sikkim
 Uttarakhand

League stage

Group A

Group B

Group C

Plate Group

Knockout stage

Quarter-finals

Semi-finals

Final

References

External links
 Series home at ESPN Cricinfo

Ranji Trophy seasons
Ranji Trophy Trophy
Ranji Trophy
Ranji Trophy